Yana Gupta (born Jana Synková; 23 April 1979) is a Czech model and actress who lives and works in India.

Early life 
Gupta was born as Jana Synková in 1979 in Brno, South Moravian Region, Czech SR, Czechoslovak SR (now Czech Republic). Her parents divorced and she was brought up with her sister by her single mother.

Career 
She started her modelling career at the age of 16, and after graduating in Park Architecture and Gardening, she moved to continue her modelling career in Japan. She later moved to India, spending her first years at ashram of Rajneesh in Pune, where she married artist Satyakam Gupta, changing her last name to Gupta.

In 2001, she entered the Indian modelling industry and became the brand ambassador of the largest Indian cosmetic brand, Lakme. In 2002, she made her first appearance in Bollywood with the song "Babuji Zara Dheere Chalo" in the film Dum. She also appeared in an item song in Venkatesh's Gharshana.

In 2009, Gupta released a book on health, How To Love Your Body And Get The Body You Love. She also released a music album. In 2011, she again appeared in an item song for the movie Murder 2. 

In 2010, Gupta was criticized after she was pictured without her underwear at a children's charity event, which she described as a wardrobe malfunction but was characterized by some commentators as a publicity stunt.

She performed in the Bigg Boss 6 finale. She reached the finale of Jhalak Dikhhla Jaa but lost to Meiyang Chang.
After participating in various TV shows, she appeared again in the film Dassehra (2018) in the item song "Joganiya".

Personal life 
She was married to Satyakam Gupta, an artist, in 2001 but they divorced in 2005.

Filmography
 Films

 Television appearances

References

External links 

 
 

Living people
1979 births
Actors from Brno
Czech film actresses
Czech expatriates in India
Actresses in Hindi cinema
Actresses in Tamil cinema
Actresses in Telugu cinema
Actresses in Kannada cinema
Actresses in Bengali cinema
European actresses in India
Actresses of European descent in Indian films
Fear Factor: Khatron Ke Khiladi participants
21st-century Czech actresses